The Afternoon Despatch & Courier was an evening tabloid in Mumbai, India. The newspaper was launched by Behram Contractor, better known as "Busybee", on 25 March 1985.

This newspaper served as a launch pad for several well-known journalists in India. The Afternoon Despatch & Courier concentrates on news and features from Mumbai and the adjoining cities.

Anant Rao Kanangi was the Associate Editor of this newspaper.

Kamal Morarka - former union minister and businessman and National president of the Samajwadi Janata Party Chandrashekhar, was the Chairman of the Board of Directors of this newspaper.

The newspaper ceased publication in Feb, 2020.

References

External links
 The Afternoon Despatch & Courier website
 Sun sets on Afternoon

Newspapers published in Mumbai
Daily newspapers published in India
Afternoon
Evening newspapers published in India
Newspapers established in 1985
1985 establishments in Maharashtra
Publications disestablished in 2020
Defunct newspapers published in India